Zuppa toscana is a broad based term, literally meaning "Tuscan soup" but in Italy it is called "Minestra di Pane" meaning "Bread Soup". Classic zuppa toscana normally is a soup made from kale, zucchini, cannellini beans, potatoes, celery, carrots, onion, tomato pulp, extra virgin olive oil, salt, powdered chili, toasted Tuscan bread, and rigatino (an Italian bacon). 

The onion, carrots and celery are diced and tossed in hot oil and salt. The other vegetables are then added with the chili and cooked for about 15 minutes. Water is added and the mixture is simmered for around 30 minutes. The soup is served on toasted Tuscan bread, with just a tiny splash of extra virgin olive oil.  

A North American version, popularized by Olive Garden and made with Italian sausage, crushed red peppers, diced white onion, bacon, garlic puree, chicken bouillon, heavy cream, potatoes, and kale is richer than the original.

See also
Ribollita

References

Italian soups
Cuisine of Tuscany